Jalan Pantai Cahaya Bulan, or Jalan Pantai Cinta Berahi, Federal Route 223 (formerly Kelantan State Route D1) is a federal road in Kelantan, Malaysia. The Kilometre Zero of the Federal Route 223 starts at Pantai Cahaya Bulan.

Features

Beach
Pantai Chinta Berahi or PCB, is a famous beach, Pantai Cahaya Bulan.

List of junctions

References

Malaysian Federal Roads
Roads in Kelantan